Protium attenuatum is a species of plant in the Burseraceae family. It is found in Dominica, Guadeloupe, Jamaica, Martinique, Saint Kitts and Nevis, Saint Lucia, and Saint Vincent and the Grenadines.

References

attenuatum
Flora of the Caribbean
Taxonomy articles created by Polbot